Anastasius (Latinized) or Anastasios is a masculine given name of Greek origin derived from the Greek word  (anastasis) meaning "resurrection". Its female form is Anastasia. A diminutive form of Anastasios is Tasos.

People

Byzantine emperors
 Anastasius I Dicorus, reign 491–518
 Anastasios II (died 719), reign 713–715

Popes of Rome 
 Pope Anastasius I, papacy 399–401
 Pope Anastasius II, papacy 496–498
 Pope Anastasius III, papacy 911–913
 Pope Anastasius IV, papacy 1153–1154

Other Christian saints and clergy 
 Saint Anastasius, martyr under Nero
 Saint Anastasius the Fuller (died 304), martyr and patron saint of fullers and weavers
  ( 263–11 May 305)
 Pope Anastasius of Alexandria, Coptic Orthodox Pope of Alexandria 605–616
 Anastasius of Antioch (disambiguation), multiple people
 Anastasius (Graeco-Roman jurist) (fl. 6th century)
 Saint Anastasius of Persia (died 628), Persian martyr
 Saint Anastasius of Pavia (died 680), bishop of Pavia
 Anastasius of Armenia, successor of Nerses III the Builder as Catholicos of Armenia from 661 to 667
 Saint Anastasius Sinaita (fl. 7th century), theologian, Father of the Eastern Orthodox Church, monk, priest, and abbot of the monastery at Mt. Sinai
 Anastasius (abbot of Euthymius) (fl. 8th century)
 Anastasius Bibliothecarius ( 810–878), librarian of the Church of Rome, scholar and statesman, sometimes identified as an Antipope
 Astrik or Saint Anastasius of Pannonhalma, ambassador of Stephen I of Hungary

 Anastasius of Suppentonia (died 570), abbot
 Patriarch Anastasius of Constantinople, Patriarch of Constantinople 730–754
Anastasius, Cardinal-priest of the title of San Clemente, c. 1102–1125
 Anastasius Germonius (1551–1627), Archbishop of Tarantaise and canon lawyer
 Anastasius the Melodist (Hymnographer), believed to be a name of three or more melodists, one of whom is believed to have been a contemporary of Rhomanos
 Anastasios (born 1929), Greek Orthodox Archbishop of Tirana, Durrës and All Albania

Politicians and military 
 Anastasios Balkos (1916–1995), Greek politician
 Anastasios Charalambis (1862–1949), Greek officer and interim Prime Minister of Greece
 Anastasios Dalipis (1896–1949), Greek Army officer and politician
 Anastasios Karatasos (1764–1830), Greek military commander during the Greek War of Independence
 Anastasios Londos (1791–1856), Greek politician and senator
 Anastasios Nerantzis (1944–2021), Greek politician
 Anastasios Papaligouras (born 1948), Greek politician
 Anastasios Papoulas (1857–1935), Greek general
 Anastasios Peponis (1924–2011), Greek politician
 Anastasios Polyzoidis (1802–1873), Greek politician and judicial official
 Anastasios Tsamados (1774–1825), Greek admiral of the Greek War of Independence

Sports 
 Anastasios Bountouris (born 1955), Greek Olympic medalist in sailing
 Anastasios Dimitriadis (born 1997), Greek footballer
 Anastasios Lagos (born 1992) Greek footballer
 Anastasios Metaxas (1862–1937), Greek architect
 Anastasios Orlandos (1887–1979), Greek archeologist and architect
 Anastasios Rousakis (born 1985), Greek footballer
 Anastasios Schizas (born 1977), Greek water polo player
 Anastasios Triantafyllou (born 1987), Greek weightlifter

Pseudonym 
 Anton Alexander Graf von Auersperg (1806–1876), Austrian poet who wrote under the pseudonym of Anastasius Grün

Other 
 Anastasius, a 19th-century novel by Thomas Hope

See also
 Anastasia
 Anastasio
Anastacio (name)

Given names of Greek language origin
Greek masculine given names